Tobias Ballari (born 28 April 1995) is an Argentine professional footballer who plays as a midfielder for Italian amateurs Bogliasco.

Career
Ballari's career began with Instituto of Primera B Nacional in 2008. At senior level, he did not appear in 2015 or 2016, though was an unused substitute during the former for a fixture with Guaraní Antonio Franco.
 A 2–0 victory over Ferro Carril Oeste on 21 May 2017 saw Ballari make his professional bow, it was one of six appearances throughout the 2016–17 campaign; just one of which was a start, versus Boca Unidos in June 2017.

On 13 April 2021, he was announced by Eccellenza Sicily amateurs Mazara as their new signing. He then left Mazara for Promozione Liguria amateurs Bogliasco.

Career statistics
.

References

External links

1995 births
Living people
Sportspeople from Córdoba Province, Argentina
Argentine footballers
Association football midfielders
Primera Nacional players
Torneo Federal A players
Instituto footballers
Sportivo Belgrano footballers